Abolla is a genus of moths of the family Noctuidae with a single species, Abolla pellicosta.

Poole (1989) included Abolla in the subfamily Ophiderinae, treated as Calpinae by Kitching & Rawlins, in Kristensen (1999).

References

Calpinae
Moths described in 1874
Erebid moths of South America